Chantel Louise Wolfenden, OAM (born 15 January 1986) is an Australian Paralympic swimmer. Born in the New South Wales town of Lithgow, she started to swim at the age of five as therapy for cerebral palsy. She underwent three operations to cut and lengthen her achilles tendon.

She competed at the 2002 IPC Swimming World Championships in Mar Del Plata, Argentina winning a gold medal in the women's 400m Freestyle S7 and two silver medals in the women's 100m Backstroke and women's 100m Freestyle S7 events.

At the 2004 Athens Games, she won a gold medal in the Women's 400 m Freestyle S7 event, for which she received a Medal of the Order of Australia, a silver medal in the Women's 100 m Freestyle S7 event, and four bronze medals in the Women's 100 m Backstroke S7, Women's 200 m Individual Medley SM7, Women's 4 × 100 m Freestyle 34 pts and Women's 4 × 100 m Medley 34 pts events.

She swam for the Fairmead Swim Club in Bundaberg, Queensland and was coached by Paul Simms.  Between 2002 and 2006, she was an Australian Institute of Sport paralympic swimming scholarship holder. She was also a Queensland Academy of Sport scholarship holder.

References

Female Paralympic swimmers of Australia
Swimmers at the 2004 Summer Paralympics
Paralympic gold medalists for Australia
Paralympic silver medalists for Australia
Paralympic bronze medalists for Australia
Cerebral Palsy category Paralympic competitors
Swimmers with cerebral palsy
Sportswomen from New South Wales
Sportswomen from Queensland
Sportspeople from Bundaberg
Recipients of the Medal of the Order of Australia
Australian Institute of Sport Paralympic swimmers
1986 births
Living people
People from the Central Tablelands
Medalists at the 2004 Summer Paralympics
Paralympic medalists in swimming
Australian female freestyle swimmers
Australian female backstroke swimmers
Australian female medley swimmers
S7-classified Paralympic swimmers
21st-century Australian women